Moul Daravorn (born 27 May 1993) is a former Cambodian footballer who played as a defender. He was a member of Cambodia national football team.

References

1993 births
Living people
Cambodian footballers
Cambodia international footballers
Preah Khan Reach Svay Rieng FC players
Sportspeople from Phnom Penh
Association football defenders